is a Japanese monthly literary magazine published by Bungeishunjū as a  oriented publication.

History and profile
The first version of Bungakukai was published from 1893 to 1898. The founders were the first generation romantic authors in the country. The magazine featured articles on romanticism, modernism and idealism. The magazine's second version started in October 1933. Bungeishunjū has owned the magazine since then.

The headquarters of Bungakukai is in Tokyo. Along with Shinchō, Gunzo, Bungei and Subaru, it is one of the five leading literary journals in Japan. It runs a contest for newcomer writers Bungakukai Shinjinshō (Newcomer Award of Literary World).

References

External links
  

1893 establishments in Japan
Literary magazines published in Japan
Magazines established in 1893
Magazines published in Tokyo
Monthly magazines published in Japan